Tricyclene synthase (EC 4.2.3.105, TPS3) is an enzyme with systematic name geranyl-diphosphate diphosphate-lyase (cyclizing; tricyclene-forming). This enzyme catalyses the following chemical reaction

 geranyl diphosphate  tricyclene + diphosphate

The enzyme from Solanum lycopersicum (tomato) gives a mixture of tricyclene, camphene, beta-myrcene and limonene.

References

External links 
 

EC 4.2.3